"I Love Saturday" is a song by British synthpop duo Erasure, released as the third single from their sixth studio album, I Say I Say I Say (1994), on 21 November 1994. It was written by Vince Clarke and Andy Bell, and produced by Martyn Ware. In addition to the normal vinyl, cassette and CD singles, Mute released the "I Love Saturday EP" in the UK shortly afterwards, which contains several new tracks.

"I Love Saturday" was released via Mute Records in the UK and Elektra Records in the US. The single peaked at number 20 on both the UK Singles Chart and the US Billboard Hot Dance Music/Club Play chart. The song also reached number 34 in Sweden and number 69 in Germany.

Critical reception
AllMusic editor Ned Raggett wrote that "I Love Saturday" "neatly balances pepped up energy on Clarke's part with a lower-key delivery from Bell", and called it a "striking combination". Larry Flick from Billboard described it as a "bouncy foray into trance-colored hi-NRG waters." He complimented Bell's "always striking voice". Ross Jones from The Guardian commented, "Every melancholic pop hook from the last 10 years lovingly stitched together with asphyxiating grace." 

Chris Gerard from Metro Weekly said the song is "great" and "infectious", adding that it "features Bell showing off his falsetto in the verses." Mario Tarradell for The Miami Herald called it "bouncy fun" and "ideal summer fare – light, bubbly and innocuous." A reviewer from Music & Media stated, "Saturday night fever is ruling again. Only the musical format has changed from disco to camp electro pop with, as ever, a high sing-along quotient." John Kilgo from The Network Forty deemed it "another fun pop hit".

Music video
A music video was produced to promote the single. It was directed by Caz Gorham and Francis Dickenson and was released on November 21, 1994. The video is made as a jaunty holiday clip shot in Andy Bell's Majorcan home. It was later published on Erasure's official YouTube channel in September 2014. The video has amassed more than 580,000 views as of October 2021.

Track listings

 Cassette single (CMUTE166)
 "I Love Saturday"
 "Dodo"
 "Because You're So Sweet" (Session Version)

 12-inch single (12MUTE166)
 "I Love Saturday"
 "I Love Saturday" (Beatmasters' Club Mix)
 "I Love Saturday" (JX Mix)
 "I Love Saturday" (Flower Mix)

 CD single 1 (CDMUTE166)
 "I Love Saturday"
 "I Love Saturday" (JX Mix)
 "I Love Saturday" (Beatmasters' Dub Mix)
 "Dodo"

 CD single 2 (LCDMUTE166)
 "I Love Saturday" (Beatmasters' Club Mix)
 "I Love Saturday" (Flower Mix)
 "I Love Saturday" (303 Mix)
 "Always" (X Dub Cut)

 I Love Saturday EP (EPCDMUTE166)
 "I Love Saturday"
 "Ghost"
 "Truly, Madly, Deeply"
 "Tragic" (Live Vocal)

 US maxi-single (66171-2)
 "I Love Saturday" (JX Mix)
 "I Love Saturday" (Beatmasters' Dub Mix)
 "I Love Saturday" (Beatmasters' Club Mix)
 "I Love Saturday" (Flower Mix)
 "Dodo"
 "Because You're So Sweet" (Session Version)

Charts

References

1994 singles
1994 songs
Elektra Records singles
Erasure songs
Mute Records singles
Songs written by Vince Clarke
Songs written by Andy Bell (singer)